Boana botumirim is a species of frog in the family Hylidae. It is endemic to Brazil. Scientists have only seen it in one place: Veredas de Botumirim in Minas Gerais.

References

Frogs of South America
Amphibians of Brazil
Amphibians described in 2009
Boana
Endemic fauna of Brazil